The Mascara campaign of 1699-1701 was launched by Moulay Zidan, son of the Moroccan Sultan Moulay Ismail, to capture the Beylik of Mascara, situated in the west of the Deylik of Algiers. This episode reopened the hostilities between the Sherifian Empire and the Regency of Algiers.

Campaign 
Sometime between 1699 and 1700, Sultan Moulay Ismail ibn Sharif instructed his son Moulay Zidan, to whom he entrusted the command of the province of Taza, to launch an offensive against the Turks of Algiers, in coordination with an offensive by the Bey of Tunis Murad III on the Beylik of Constantine, which triggered a two front war against the Deylik of Algiers.

The Moroccan army, mainly composed of the Black Guard, commanded by Moulay Zidan, managed to chase the Turks from Tlemcen. The Moroccan army besieged the city defended by armed Kouloughlis whom were the main inhabitants of the city, and even pushed as far as Mascara, the capital of the Western Beylik, whose Bey Othman was absent due to an expedition. The Moroccans ravaged the whole region, ransacked the city, even looting the Bey's palace. However, perhaps to save his loot, Moulay Zidan returned to Morocco after agreeing to a peace negotiation with the Turks, which angered Moulay Ismail because it allowed the Dey of Algiers to concentrate on its eastern front against the army of the Bey of Tunis, which he crushed between Setif and Constantine.

After dismissing his son, Moulay Ismail resumed the campaign and led in person another offensive against the Algerians in 1701. After crossing the Algerian border, he was defeated at the Battle of Chelif.

References 

17th century in Algeria
17th century in Morocco
18th century in Algeria
18th century in Morocco
Battles involving Algeria
Battles involving Morocco
Wars involving Algeria
Wars involving Morocco
1699 in Africa
1700 in Africa
1701 in Africa
Conflicts in 1699
Conflicts in 1700
Conflicts in 1701